Kirundo Province is one of the eighteen provinces of Burundi. Kirundo has three big lakes: Cohoha, Rweru, and Rwihinda. Lakes Cohoha and Rweru are located in commune Busone, and Lake Rwihinda is in commune Kirundo. Kirundo is the capital city of province Kirundo.

Before the climate change, Kirundo was the richest province because of its productive land. Now Kirundo is no longer productive. The climate change devastate the province forever. In fifteen years those three lakes are almost half evaporated.

It is the northernmost province and it shares an international border with Rwanda.

Communes
It is divided administratively into the following communes:

 Commune of Bugabira
 Commune of Busoni
 Commune of Bwambarangwe
 Commune of Gitobe
 Commune of Kirundo
 Commune of Ntega
 Commune of Vumbi

 
Provinces of Burundi